The following is a list of Singaporean electoral divisions from 1963 to 1968 that served as constituencies that elected members to the 3rd Legislative Assembly of Singapore in the 1963 Singaporean general elections. Upon Singapore's independence in 1965, the Legislative Assembly was dissolved and became the 1st Parliament of Singapore.

Constituencies

References

External links 
 

1963
1963 Singaporean general election